Ma-i or Maidh (also spelled Ma'I,  Mai, Ma-yi or Mayi;;; Hokkien ; Mandarin ) was an ancient sovereign state located in what is now the Philippines.

Its existence was first documented in 971 in the Song dynasty documents known as the History of Song, and it was also mentioned in the 10th century records of the Bruneian Empire. Based on these and other mentions until the early 14th century, contemporary scholars believe Ma-i was located either in Bay, Laguna or on the island of Mindoro.

Research by Fay Cooper Cole for the Field Museum in Chicago in 1912 showed that the ancient name of Mindoro was Mait. Mindoro's indigenous groups are called Mangyans and to this day, the Mangyans call the lowlands of Bulalacao in Oriental Mindoro, Mait. For most of the 20th century, historians generally accepted the idea that Mindoro was the political center of the ancient Philippine polity. But a 2005 study by Filipino-Chinese historian Go Bon Juan suggested that the historical descriptions better match Bay, Laguna (pronounced Ba-i), which is written similarly to Ma-i in "Chinese orthography" according to Go Bon Juan's understanding, which in Hokkien Chinese, the literary reading for the first character, 麻, is "mâ", meanwhile, the vernacular reading could also be pronounced and read as "bâ" or "môa", but the second character, 逸, has the literary reading of "i̍t", while a vernacular reading of "ia̍k" (Quanzhou) or "e̍k" (Amoy & Zhangzhou) or "ia̍t" (Amoy).

Possible sites 
For many years, scholars believed that Ma-i was likely to have been on the island of Mindoro within the Municipality of Bulalacao as there is an old settlement there named Mait.  But recent scholarship casts doubt on this theory, arguing that historical descriptions better match Bay, Laguna (whose name is pronounced Ba-i), which once occupied a large territory on the eastern coasts of Laguna de Bay.

Both sites have names which sound similar to Ma-i. The pre-colonial name of Mindoro was "Ma-it", whereas historical variants of the name of Bay, Laguna include "Bae", "Bai", and "Vahi".

Documentary sources 

The Chinese and Bruneian records both describe trade relations with Ma-i.

Ma-i is first mentioned in Volume 186 of official history of the Song Dynasty, which lists Ma-i among the southern sea nations with whom Chinese merchants traded  in the year 971 AD (the fourth year of Kai Bao of Song). The document describes the government's efforts to regulate and tax this "luxurious" trade.  Historian W.H. Scott describes this entry as "the first positive reference to political states in or near the Philippines." 

Ma-i could be possibly mentioned earlier since the Arabic author Al Ya'akubi writing in 800 recorded that the kingdom of Musa (Muja, which is old Brunei) was in alliance with the kingdom of Mayd (Either Ma-i or Madja-as in the Philippines), against the Chinese Empire which they waged war against.

In 1980, historian Robert Nicholl argued that the nation of "Maidh", referred to in the tenth century records of the Sultanate of Brunei, refer to Ma-i, although Scott does not recognize this as a positive identification.

Later references to Ma-i, all describing trade, include:
 another mention (in Volume 489) in the History of Song, 
 the 1225 AD Song Dynasty Document Zhu Fan Zhi, 
 the 1317 AD Yuan Dynasty document Wenxian Tongkao, and 
 the 1349 AD Yuan Dynasty document Daoyi Zhilüe.

Historiography 

The majority of these sources only mention Ma-i briefly, either affirming that Ma-i was one of the nations conducting trade in the "south seas" area, or repeating hearsay about the supposed location of Ma-i.  W.H. Scott notes that of the documents describing Ma-i, only the Zu Fan Zhi and the Daoyi Zhilüe provide substantial details. Filipino Chinese historian Bon Juan Go, in turn, notes that only the Wenxian Tongkao and Volumes 186 and 489 of the History of Song provide definitive dates.

Because all of these are Chinese Imperial documents, historiographers have to consider the Sinocentric nature of the sources whenever conducting their analysis.
 
 notes:

Description 
In 1225, the Zhu Fan Zhi noted that "the country of Ma-i is to the north of Borneo" and added that few pirates reach these shores.  It also noted that "the people of Ma-i live in large villages (literally "settlements of more than a thousand households") on the opposite banks of a stream."

The 1349 document Daoyi Zhilüe also noted that the settlement of Ma-i consisted of houses arranged on the two banks of a stream. It also noted that "its mountain range is flat and broad", "the fields are fertile," and "the climate is rather hot."

Economic activities and trade practices 
Because all the documents describing Ma-I were primarily concerned with trade, this is the most documented aspect of Ma-I culture.

Exported products 
Both the Song Dynasty records (specifically the Zhu Fan Zhi), and Yuan Dynasty records (specifically the Daoyi Zhilüe) describe the local products as "kapok cotton, yellow bees-wax, tortoise shell, medicinal betel nuts and cloth of various patterns." (The 1225 Zhu Fan Zhi lists "yuta cloth" while the 1349 Daoyi Zhilüe lists "cloth of various patterns.")

Barter items accepted as exchange 
The Zhu Fan Zhi notes that in exchange, the locals accepted products such as "porcelain, trade gold, iron pots, lead, colored glass beads, and iron needles."  The Daoyi Zhilüe later lists "caldrons, pieces of iron, red cloth or taffetas of various color stripes, ivory,  and 'tint or the like'" as accepted items of exchange.

Administration of trade 
The Zhu Fan Zhi notes that Ma-I's official plaza is its official venue for barter and trade, and note that officials have to be presented with white parasols as gifts:

The Zhu Fan Zhi further describes the process of transaction as follows:

The Daoyi Zhilüe similarly describes it:

Possible use of trade gold 
The discovery of small gold ingots (referred to by modern numismatists as Piloncitos), presumed to have been used as currency and "stamped with what looks like the pre-Spanish Baybayin character 'ma'", have led some historians such as Ambeth Ocampo theorize that the writing may be a reference to Ma-i, although numerous other interpretations have also been suggested.

Culture

Religion

While documents did not definitively describe the religious beliefs of the people of Ma-i, the Zhu Fan Zhi did note the presence of unspecified religious artifacts in Mayi, supposedly as of 1225 AD: 

Contemporary historiographers do not draw conclusions about the religion of Ma-i's residents based on this text.  In his book "Prehispanic Source Materials for the Study of Philippine History", W.H. Scott notes that a literal translation of the Zhu Fan Zhi text describes "metal buddhas."  However, he and Chinese Scholar I-hsiung Ju translate this in 1968 as "metal images" to correct for the linguistic bias of the text.

In his seminal 1984 book Prehispanic Source Materials for the Study of Philippine History, Scott particularly questioned whether the presence of these images reflect actual beliefs by the people of Ma-i: 

Earlier writers, including Jose Rizal and Ferdinand Blumentritt, accepted the "buddhist connection" more readily.  For example, in supporting Blumentritt's proposition that Ma-i was somewhere on Luzon Island, Rizal cites the Zhu Fan Zhi's use of the word "Buddhas" as evidence: 

Precluding the findings of any Buddhist artifacts in Ma-i, an American archaeologist, Henry Otley Beyer, was able to excavate from Palawan, an island Southwest of Mindoro which is presumably Ma-i, a clay medallion of a Buddhist Bodhisattva. The presence of this Buddhist religious item along with the incorporation of Tantric philosophical and religious ideals in Tagalog vocabulary maybe proofs that indeed Ma-i was practicing Buddhism before the advent of Islam.

Food
The Chinese records made no specific note of the solid food the people of Ma-i ate, but the Daoyi Zhilüe did describe their process for making alcoholic beverages:

Clothing
The Zhu Fan Zhi describes the people of Ma-i as covering themselves "with a cloth like a sheet or hide their bodies with a loin cloth." And the Daoyi Zhilüe, written a century later, describes the clothing and coiffure of the people of Ma-i, saying "In their customs they esteem the quality of chastity and uprightness. Both men and women do up their hair in a mallet-like tress. They wear a blue cotton shirt."

Funerary practices
In 1349, the Daoyi Zhilüe also made observations of funerary practices, describing them thus:

Diplomatic relations

Relationship with China and Brunei 
 notes that Ma-i's  relationship with Song and Yuan Dynasty was defined by trade, not by diplomacy: 

The nature of Ma-i's relationship with Brunei is less clear because of scant documentation, but there is no indication of any relationship other than possible trade. However, in the 1300s the Chinese annals, Nanhai zhi, reported that Brunei had invaded or administered the Philippine kingdoms of Butuan, Sulu and Ma-i as well, which would regain their independence at a later date.

Relationship with nearby territories
The Zhu Fan Zhi mentions a number of territories in its account of Ma-i, saying:

Contemporary scholars believe that these are the Baipuyan (Babuyan Islands), Bajinong (Busuanga), Liyin (Lingayen) and Lihan (present day Malolos City). Malolos is a coastal town and one of the ancient settlement around Manila Bay near Tondo.

While the phrase "subordinates" has sometimes been interpreted to mean that these places are territories of Ma-I, Scott clarifies that:

Ma-i after the Yuan Dynasty records 
No mentions of the country of Ma-i have been found after 1349 (or 1339 depending on the source).  However, historians generally believe that Ma-i continued to exist under a different name. Early theories for the location of Ma-i include locations in Central Luzon, or the Southern Tagalog area. Many 20th Century Scholars came to accept the idea that Ma-i was located on the island of Mindoro, based on the name of Mait, a place on the island.  However, this has been questioned on the basis of physical evidence and an analysis of Chinese orthography, and Bay (pronounced "Ba-i" or "Ba-e" by locals) has once again been suggested as a likely location of Ma-i.

Bay, Laguna as Ma-i 
The idea that Ma-i was located somewhere in the Tagalog region was proposed early on by scholars such as Blumentritt and Rizal. Eventually, though, it became popular during the middle and late 20th century to believe that it had become "Mait", a place now located in Mindoro.

In 2004, Chinese Filipino scholar Bon Juan Go questioned this common belief, citing the lack of physical evidence for a large, prosperous settlement on the island of Mindoro.  He suggested that Chinese orthography equally allows for the possibility that Ma-i became Bay, Laguna, whose name is pronounced "" (IPA: /bɐʔˈɛ/) by locals. He notes that Bay is also a match for the physical characteristics of Ma-i, and that numerous artifacts found in the area (including the nearby towns of  Victoria Pila and Lumban, Laguna) suggest the presence of a prosperous pre-colonial settlement. Grace P. Odal-Devora notes that this region was the place of the taga-ilaya, whereas the taga-laud who settled downstream on the banks of the Pasig River.

Go suggests that Ma-i, as Ba-e, became less important as the riverine settlements of Namayan, Tondo, and Maynila rose to power, but also noted that Ba-i still nonetheless served as the capital for the province of Laguna de Bay, which would later be split into the provinces of Laguna and Morong (modern day Rizal Province, including coastal towns now administered by the National Capital Region).

 Hokkien 

 Mandarin

Mindoro as Ma-i 

Philippine historians of the middle and late 20th century widely believed Ma-i could be equated with "Mait", a place now located in Mindoro, because research by Fay Cooper Cole for the Field Museum in Chicago in 1912 discovered that the ancient name of Mindoro was Mait.  Writing in 1984, Scott said that "there [was] no reason to doubt that Ma-i or "Ma-yit"- is Mindoro, for Mait was the old name of the island when the Spaniards arrived, and that name is still known to its hill tribes and Fishermen."

This has been contested in contemporary scholarship, but textbooks containing this assumption are still widely in use.

Later events on the island of Mindoro 

If, even though it had disappeared from historical writings, Ma-i really was located in Mindoro and it continued to exist until 1500, some believe by it would have been affected by the raids conducted by the Sultanate of Brunei around the year 1498-99, which included a series of raids against the Kingdom of Taytay in Palawan and the island of Mindoro.

If Ma-i continued to exist until the 1570s, then it must have been affected by the arrival of the Spanish conquerors. As described in an anonymous account translated in Blair and Robertson's The Philippine Islands, 1493–1898, Miguel López de Legazpi sent Captain Martin de Goiti and Juan de Salcedo on an expedition to Mindoro in May 1570, to counteract Muslim pirates based on the island who were attacking their new headquarters on nearby Panay Island. Legazpi himself would arrive on Mindoro the next year, 1571. Each fort, moreover, had 10 to 12 lantakas, not  counting several smaller guns. After destroying these Muslim forts, they despoiled the town of Mamburao while they were at Mindoro. There was even stone walls in one of the hills defending Mindoro.

The Spanish Advent
Whatever happened to Ma-i between the last time it was mentioned by documents at the end of the Yuan Dynasty in the 1300s and the beginning of Philippines Spanish in the 1570s, both Mindoro and Bay eventually became part of the Philippine Islands under the dominion of Spain.

Presumed Rulers of Ma-i

Associated Filipino Family Names 
 Gatmaitan - Ferdinand Blumentritt believed that Ma-i may have been the origin of the Filipino Family name Gatmaitan, which can be broken down into "Gat", meaning leader or lord; the word Mait; and the suffix "-an", which indicates a place name.  The ancestor which gave the Gatmaitan family its name was lord of a place named "Mait" or "Maitan" 
 Gatchalian - Misinterpretations of the word "Shi" in the Song dynasty records have led to the family name Gatchalian also being associated with Ma-i. The name can be broken down as "Gat Sa Li-han" (Lord at Li-han), and the records list Li-han as one of the palaces "of Ma-i's Shi."  Scott debunks the perception that Li-han is a place ruled by Ma-i, and suggests instead that Li-han is a place "of the same kind" (but of lesser rank) as Ma-i. Also, instead of equating Li-han with Malolos, Scott suggested that Li-han may be Lumban, Laguna.

See also
History of the Philippines (900-1521)
Prehistory of Laguna (province)
Mindoro (province)
History of Song
Zhu Fan Zhi
Wenxian Tongkao
Daoyi Zhilüe
William Henry Scott (historian)
Maginoo
Principalia

Notes

References

Sources

 
 
 
 
 
 
 
 

 

 

Former countries in Southeast Asia
History of the Philippines (900–1565)
Former countries in Philippine history
Barangay states
History of Luzon